Hamidul Islam (born 17 May 1995) is a Bangladeshi cricketer. He made his List A debut for Shinepukur Cricket Club in the 2018–19 Dhaka Premier Division Cricket League on 11 March 2019. He made his Twenty20 debut for Shinepukur Cricket Club in the 2018–19 Dhaka Premier Division Twenty20 Cricket League on 25 February 2019.

References

External links
 

1995 births
Living people
Bangladeshi cricketers
People from Nilphamari District
Shinepukur Cricket Club cricketers